Interlaken is a former district of the canton of Bern, now part of the Interlaken-Oberhasli district.
Its administrative capital was Interlaken. It comprised 23 municipalities with a total area of 724 km²:

CH-3803 Beatenberg
CH-3806 Bönigen
CH-3855 Brienz
CH-3856 Brienzwiler
CH-3707 Därligen
CH-3818 Grindelwald
CH-3814 Gsteigwiler
CH-3815 Gündlischwand
CH-3804 Habkern
CH-3858 Hofstetten bei Brienz
CH-3800 Interlaken
CH-3807 Iseltwald
CH-3822 Lauterbrunnen
CH-3706 Leissigen
CH-3816 Lütschental
CH-3800 Matten bei Interlaken
CH-3853 Niederried bei Interlaken
CH-3854 Oberried am Brienzersee
CH-3852 Ringgenberg
CH-3813 Saxeten
CH-3855 Schwanden bei Brienz
CH-3800 Unterseen
CH-3812 Wilderswil

Former districts of the canton of Bern
Bernese Oberland